The 2018 Ohio Machine season is the seventh season for the Ohio Machine of Major League Lacrosse. The reigning champion Machine come into the year looking to repeat as Steinfeld Cup Champions. They would be the first team since the Chesapeake Bayhawks in 2012 and 2013 to do so.

The Machine opened their title defense on April 29 with a historic output from Marcus Holman, who scored a league record 11 goals in a 25-13 victory over the New York Lizards. The team took a hard fall, though, losing ten of their last 11 games and finishing with a league-worst 3-11 record.

Offseason
October 2, 2017 - The Machine agreed to trade attackman Steele Stanwick to the Chesapeake Bayhawks in return for a second round pick in the 2019 collegiate draft. The team also agreed to send faceoff specialist Kevin Reisman to the Florida Launch in exchange for a fourth round pick in the 2018 supplemental draft.
October 8 - The Machine hosted the first Ohio Lacrosse Fall Classic at Fortress Obetz against the Ohio State Buckeyes men's lacrosse team.
November 7 - Machine president Ryan Chenault confirms the team will extend head coach Bear Davis's contract through the 2020 season, after Davis led the franchise to its first MLL title in 2017.

Regular season

Transactions
May 30 - The Machine agree to trade midfielder Mark Cockerton and a 2019 collegiate draft seventh round pick to the Boston Cannons in exchange for attackman Davey Emala.
June 19 - The Machine send defenseman Matt McMahon to the Charlotte Hounds in exchange for defender Ben Randall.
June 26 - The Machine send defenseman Jake Bernhardt to the New York Lizards in exchange for Ryan Walsh and a 2019 second round draft pick.
June 27 - Connor Cannizzaro announces his retirement after being the team drafted him fifth in the 2017 collegiate draft.

Schedule

Regular season

Standings

References

External links
 Team Website

Major League Lacrosse seasons
Ohio Machine